The Malaysian Industry-Government Group for High Technology (MIGHT) is an independent non-profit technology think tank under the purview of the Prime Minister's Department. It was established in 1993 to support the Science Advisor to the Prime Minister and leverage on the multi-disciplinary and inter-ministerial synergies from both the industry and Government.

MIGHT was tasked to help drive the advancement of high technology competency and capacity in Malaysia. A public-private partnership organization in nature, it provides a consensus building platform for collaboration in developing policies and strategic advice to the government.

Through its platform and works, MIGHT gave birth to notable and strategic national initiatives such Malaysian Formula 1 Grand Prix, Kulim High-Tech Park, Malaysian Automotive Institute, Technology Depository Agency and many others.

History 
Malaysia's emphasis on development of science and technology is nothing new. The government has long initiated active measures to promote and develop techno-business opportunities by harnessing science and technology. In 1984, under then Prime Minister Dr. Mahathir Mohamad, a Science Advisor's post was created in the Prime Minister's Department to create a conducive ecosystem where science and technology and its uptake could flourish. The move is seen as complementary as well as to provide a second opinion to those of the relevant Ministries. Dr. Omar Abdul Rahman was appointed to the post of Science Advisor to the Prime Minister and held the post until he retired in 2001.

The seed of MIGHT was sown when a Unit under the Office of Science Advisor was created aptly named 'High Technology Special Unit' (Unit Khas Teknologi Tinggi). This unit then grew to become what MIGHT is today.

MIGHT's focus and emphasis has been very dynamic throughout the years but has always been in the areas of high technology and heavy engineering. The focus emphasis was dependent on the maturity of the industry as well as timing of the intervention.

Board and management

Joint chairmen 
MIGHT is chaired jointly by the Science advisor as well as a senior captain of the industry appointed by the Prime Minister.

Since 2011:
 Prof. Dr. Zakri Abdul Hamid, Science Advisor to the Prime Minister of Malaysia
 Dr. Ir. Ahmad Tajuddin Ali, Chairman of UEM Group, Chairman of SIRIM

Board of directors 
MIGHT's board is represented by both senior government officials and captains of the industry.

Government representation
 Prime Minister's Department
 Economic Planning Unit
 Ministry of Finance
 Ministry of Science, Technology and Innovation
 Ministry of Energy, Green Technology and Water
 Ministry of International Trade and Industry

Industry representation
 Petronas - Petroliam Nasional Berhad
 TNB - Tenaga Nasional Berhad
 MARA -Majlis Amanah Rakyat
 Sime Darby Berhad
 Bina Puri Holdings Berhad
 First Solar Malaysia Sdn Bhd
 System Consultancy Services Sdn Bhd

Senior Management 
MIGHT is helmed by a President and Chief Executive Officer and supported by Senior Vice Presidents and Vice Presidents. The make up of the senior management changes with the growth of the organization as well as changes in emphasis to reflect the dynamic nature of MIGHT's focus areas.

President and CEO 
 Since 2008 - Dr. Yusoff Sulaiman

Senior vice presidents
 Since 2012 - Dr. Raslan Ahmad
 Since 2014 - Rushdi Abdul Rahim

Vice presidents 
 Since 2009 - Abdul Halim Bisri 
 Since 2009 - Mohd Zakwan Mohd Zabidi

Programs and activities

Foresight and futures thinking 
Foresight and futures thinking is the core competency and activity of MIGHT. Known as technology prospecting in its early days, MIGHT has been conducting technology foresight and futures studies work to support its other activities though there are evolution and changes to the methods and processes. To expand foresight beyond technology, MIGHT created myForesight - Malaysia Foresight Institute in 2012.

myForesight (Malaysian Foresight Institute) 
myForesight was created in 2012 with the objectives:
 To explore of future possibilities for better decision making
 To build national capacity in foresight and futures

Technology priorities and advancement 
Outcome of MIGHT's foresight and future studies are used to prioritize technology and industry development in Malaysia. To date, MIGHT has produced more than twenty industry/sector blueprints and road maps. These documents were used as references to chart the development of various industry and technology in Malaysia. Various white papers and proposals by MIGHT are also used for these purposes.

In continuous search of new areas, some of these programs have since been passed to other government agencies or machineries to undertake.

Technology and industry plans and reports 
 Malaysian high technology report
 Malaysian aerospace industry report
 Malaysian shipbuilding and ship repairs industry report
 Malaysian solar industry report

Technology and industry advancement programs 
 National Offset Program (Now by Technology Depository Agency)
 Malaysia Automotive Institute (Now under the purview of Ministry of International Trade and Investment)
 Malaysia Microchip Project
 Industrialized Building System - IBS

Global strategies and outreach 
Since its inception, MIGHT has actively been leveraging its global network as part of a strategy to built national capacity as well as to disseminate knowledge and expertise. Notable past activities includes Langkawi International Dialogue, various Smart Partnership program with CPTM.

Global Science, Innovation and Advisory Council (GSIAC) 
GSIAC is chaired by the Prime Minister of Malaysia, YAB Dato’ Sri Mohd Najib Tun Razak, The secretary is the Science Advisor to the Prime Minister of Malaysia. The council consists of selected Malaysian Ministers, national and global corporate leaders, Nobel Laureates, eminent global academicians and researchers. The council meets once a year to deliberate on strategic and future matters that will benefit Malaysia in the long run

Malaysia - Korea Technology Center (myKOR) 
myKOR or Malaysia Korea Technology Center was launched by Prime Minister Abdullah Ahmad Badawi on 20 October 2008. The center purpose is to serve as a gateway for Malaysian organizations and businesses to capitalize and gain access to the pool of Korean IPs and technologies, for the purpose of enhancing and increasing the value of Malaysian made products and services.

Enhancing future talents 
Recognizing that technology and industry development will require the necessary human capital to support them, MIGHT has been involved in various human capital development programs. This is done through partnership with selected educational institutions as well as industry collaborators. These includes programs that aims to promote the uptake of Science, Technology, Engineering and Mathematics (STEM) amongst students as well as industry bridging programs.

Kuala Lumpur Engineering Science Fair (KLESF) 
KLESF is an annual program jointly organized by MIGHT, Akademi Sains Malaysia, Universiti Teknologi MARA and Universiti Tunku Abdul Rahman. The program objectives is to promote STEM (Science, Technology, Engineering and Mathematics) to students, parents, teachers and public alike.

Fame Lab Malaysia 
Fame Lab is a science communication competition co-organized by MIGHT and British Council in search of the best science communicator in the country. In 2016, Dr Abhimanyu Veerakumarasivam, representing Malaysia won the ‘Best Science Communicator award at Fame Lab International 2016. Fame Lab International is the world's biggest science communication competitions organized in the United Kingdom attracting participants from 27 countries.

School Lab Malaysia 
School Lab Malaysia is a science communication competition that aims to help students understand the exciting challenges of science, develop critical and creative thinking skills and, at the same time, gain confidence to present their understanding of scientific concepts.

Technopreneurship excellence 
MIGHT's foray into entrepreneurship is due to its role in encouraging the uptake of technology business. To date MIGHT's venture into this includes technology advice and coaching, market identification and access.

Global Cleantech Innovation Program (GCIP) 
Global Cleantech Innovation Program (GCIP) is a program conducted in collaboration with United Nations Industrial Development Organization (UNIDO) and Cleantech Open to assist Malaysian entrepreneurs in the area of green and clean technology. The program started in 2014 and the winners of the program are given opportunities to pitch in Silicon Valley as well as access to funding provided by Platcom Ventures.

External links 
 Malaysian Industry Government Group for High Technology official portal
 Official Portal of Prime Minister's Department 
 Global Science, Innovation and Advisory Council
 Global Cleantech Innovation Program
 myForesight - Malaysian Foresight Institute

References 

1993 establishments in Malaysia
Think tanks established in 1993
Think tanks based in Malaysia
Science and technology think tanks
Science and technology in Malaysia
Scientific organisations based in Malaysia
Prime Minister's Department (Malaysia)